Maksim Georgiyevich Andronik (born 20 February 1979) is a former Russian professional football player. He also holds Moldovan citizenship.

External links
 Career summary by sportbox.ru
 

1979 births
Living people
Russian footballers
Association football defenders
Moldovan Super Liga players
FC Dacia Chișinău players
CS Tiligul-Tiras Tiraspol players